Eurystylus is a genus of true bugs belonging to the family Miridae.

The genus has almost cosmopolitan distribution.

Species:

Eurystylus alboplagiatus 
Eurystylus annulipes 
Eurystylus antennatus 
Eurystylus apicifer 
Eurystylus austrinus 
Eurystylus bakeri 
Eurystylus bellevoyei 
Eurystylus brunneus 
Eurystylus burmanicus 
Eurystylus capensis 
Eurystylus cardui 
Eurystylus coelestialium 
Eurystylus costalis 
Eurystylus erebus 
Eurystylus fuscatus 
Eurystylus horvathi 
Eurystylus jingfui 
Eurystylus latus 
Eurystylus lestoni 
Eurystylus lineaticollis 
Eurystylus luteus 
Eurystylus marginatus 
Eurystylus minutus 
Eurystylus montanus 
Eurystylus oldi 
Eurystylus pallidus 
Eurystylus reuteri 
Eurystylus rubroscutellatus 
Eurystylus rufocunealis 
Eurystylus ryukyus 
Eurystylus sauteri 
Eurystylus schoutedeni 
Eurystylus scutellaris 
Eurystylus varipennis

References

Miridae